Parornix alni is a moth of the family Gracillariidae. It is known from the Japan (Hokkaidō, Honshū) and the Russian Far East.

The wingspan is 8–9 mm.

The larvae feed on Alnus hirsuta. They mine the leaves of their host plant.

References

Parornix
Moths of Japan
Moths of Asia
Moths described in 1965